Usko Urho Uljas Kemppi  (until 1943 Hurmerinta, 12 February 1907 – 13 May 1994) was a Finnish composer, lyricist, author and screenwriter. His body of work consisted of songs, plays and manuscripts.

Selected filmography as a screenwriter 

 Linnaisten vihreä kamari (1945)
 Maaret – tunturien tyttö (1947)
 Sillankorvan emäntä (1953)
 Siltalan pehtoori (1953)
 Nuoruus vauhdissa (1961)

References

External links 
 Usko Kemppi Seura
 

1907 births
1994 deaths
People from Oripää
People from Turku and Pori Province (Grand Duchy of Finland)